Michael L. Telson is an American engineer currently at the Federation of American Scientists and General Atomics Corporation and is an Elected Fellow of the American Association for the Advancement of Science, since 1999 and also an American Physical Society Fellow since 2004. He is an expert on technology and formulation policies and budgets. From 1975 to 1995, he was on the U.S. House of Representatives Budget Committee. From 1997 to 2001, he was the chief financial officer for the U. S. Department of Energy.

Education
He earned his Ph.D. (1973), E.E., M.S. and B.S. from Massachusetts Institute of Technology and an M.S. in management from MIT.

Publications
The economics of alternative levels of reliability for electric power generation systems, ML Telson – The Bell Journal of Economics, 1975
The economics of reliability for electric generation systems, ML Telson – 1973, MIT

References

Year of birth missing (living people)
Living people
Fellows of the American Association for the Advancement of Science
Fellows of the American Physical Society
21st-century American engineers
MIT School of Engineering alumni
MIT Sloan School of Management alumni